Oatmeal is ground oat groats. It may also refer to:

 Oatmeal, Texas, an unincorporated community in Texas
 The Oatmeal, a website featuring comics